Wang Yu is a Chinese film director and cinematographer graduated from the Beijing Film Academy. Yu started his movie career in the 1990s and over the past decades, he has achieved great success as an esteemed cinematographer. Yu has collaborated with many prominent Chinese Filmmakers and Directors, including Tian Zhuangzhuang, Lou Ye, and Li Yu. He began his career in 1998 with Lou Ye's film Suzhou River.

Yu Wang is a recipient of numerous international accolades. For his work on the film The Go Master, He was awarded the Golden Goblet for Best Cinematography at the 10th Shanghai International Film Festival in 2007, and nominated for Achievement in Cinematography at the 2007 Asia Pacific Screen Awards. In 2015, He is the recipient of Hong Kong Film Award for Best Cinematography with The Golden Era.

Filmography

As cinematographer

As director

References

External links 
 
 

Chinese cinematographers
Year of birth missing (living people)
Living people